is a practice of using hand gestures found today in Shugendō and Shingon Mikkyō. It is also present in some old and traditional schools ("ryūha") of Japanese martial arts including but not exclusive to schools that have ties with ninjutsu.

The Nine Cuts
 (臨) Rin – Power over oneself & others
 (兵) Pyō – Direction of energy
 (闘) Toh – Harmony with nature
 (者) Sha – Healing of oneself & others
 (皆) Kai – Premonition of danger
 (陣) Jin– Knowing the thoughts of others
 (列) Retsu – Dimension
 (在) Zai - Creation
 (前) Zen – Enlightenment

Religious symbolism and meanings
The Kuji-in were created from the gesture of both the hands. The left hand Taizokai represents a receptive valence, and the right hand Kongokai conveys an emitter valence. The Kuji Kiri performed with the right hand are to emphasize the cut of the ignorance of the Maya (illusion) (that is the deceptive sensory world) through the Sword of the Wisdom. In this way, according to the belief system of Shingon Mikkyo, one would come to create an opening in the daily world that would allow oneself to reach various states of consciousness. Derived from the Taoist dualism, Jaho could be seen as Yin, and Kobudera as Yang.

See also
 Kuji-in
 Mudra
 Glossary of Shinto
 Glossary of Japanese Buddhism

References

External links

Japanese martial arts terminology
Ninjutsu skills
Shingon Buddhism
Shinto